The 13th edition of the annual Hypo-Meeting took place on May 23 and May 24, 1987 in Götzis, Austria. The track and field competition featured a decathlon (men) and a heptathlon (women) event.

Men's Decathlon

Schedule

May 23

May 24

Records

Results

Women's Heptathlon

Schedule

May 23

May 24

Records

Notes

See also
1987 World Championships in Athletics – Men's decathlon
1987 World Championships in Athletics – Women's heptathlon

References
 Statistics
 decathlon2000
 1987 Year Ranking Decathlon

1987
Hypo-Meeting
Hypo-Meeting